The 2002–03 Super 16 season was the 82nd season of the Super 16, the top level of ice hockey in France. 15 teams participated in the league, and Dragons de Rouen won their seventh league title.

First round

Northern Group

Southern Group

Second round

Final round

Playoffs

Qualification round

External links 
 Season on hockeyarchives.info

France
Elite
Ligue Magnus seasons